Fabiano Fontanelli (born 24 April 1965 in Faenza) is an Italian former road bicycle racer.

Major results

1990
2nd Giro di Romagna
1991
1st  Overall Giro di Puglia
1st Stage 1
1993
1st Stage 11 Giro d'Italia
1st Stage 5 Tour de Pologne
1st Giro della Provincia di Reggio Calabria
1994
Clásico RCN
1st Prologue & Stage 1
1st Stage 1 Vuelta a los Valles Mineros
8th Milan–San Remo
1995
1st Stage 5 Tour de Luxembourg
1st Grand Prix Pino Cerami 
6th Milan–San Remo
1996
1st Stage 12 Giro d'Italia
1st Stage 3 Tirreno–Adriatico
1st Stage 2 Giro del Trentino
1st Stage 3 Tour Méditerranéen
1st Grand Prix d'Ouverture La Marseillaise
1st Trofeo Pantalica
1st Giro dell'Etna
1997
Tour de Langkawi
1st Stages 11 & 12
1st Stage 16 Giro d'Italia
1998
1st Stage 16 Giro d'Italia
1999
1st Stage 5a Setmana Catalana de Ciclisme
1st Paris–Camembert
9th Rund um den Henninger Turm
10th GP de Denain Porte du Hainaut
2000
1st Stage 5 Settimana Internazionale di Coppi e Bartali
6th Clásica de Almería
10th Veenendaal–Veenendaal
2001
1st Stage 2 Vuelta a Asturias
2002 
1st  Overall Giro della Provincia di Lucca
1st Stage 1
1st GP Citta di Rio Saliceto e Correggio
2nd Giro di Romagna
4th Giro del Lazio
4th GP Industria & Commercio di Prato
4th Giro dell'Emilia
5th Coppa Sabatini
7th Gran Premio Bruno Beghelli
10th GP Città di Camaiore
2003
3rd GP Industria & Artigianato Larciano

External links

1965 births
Italian male cyclists
Living people
Italian Giro d'Italia stage winners
People from Faenza
Cyclists from Emilia-Romagna
Sportspeople from the Province of Ravenna